"Tell Me Why" is a rock song by Genesis. It first appeared as the seventh track on their 14th studio album, We Can't Dance (1991), and was issued as a single in Europe in 1992 and in the United Kingdom on 8 February 1993. It was the last Genesis single featuring Phil Collins on vocals before leaving the group in March 1996.

Background
A royalty from the single was donated to the Bosnian Save the Children and Red Cross charities. This was in keeping with the lyric of the song, which expressed disdain for hypocrisy about food and shelter ("You say there's nothing you can do / Is there one rule for them and one for you?").

Reflecting the emerging trend for CD singles, "Tell Me Why" was issued as two separate discs in the UK. Both editions came in digipaks with identical artwork, and were backed by a live version of "Dreaming While You Sleep." The first CD featured a 1992 version of "Turn It On Again" as an exclusive track, while the second included a full performance of "Tonight, Tonight, Tonight" from the video, Live at Wembley Stadium (this song segued into "Invisible Touch" on the We Can't Dance tour).

In Europe the live B-sides were "Mama", "The Brazilian" (both from the Invisible Touch tour) and the single version of "Invisible Touch."

Unlike its four predecessors, the single was not a commercial success, barely breaching the UK Top 40.

The working title of "Tell Me Why" was originally "Rickenbacker" after the 12-string Rickenbacker guitar used by Mike Rutherford on the song. Rickenbackers are known for their distinct "ringing" sound.

Track listings
CD single
 "Tell Me Why" – 4:58
 "Dreaming While You Sleep" (live) – 7:55
 "Tonight, Tonight, Tonight" (full version live – Wembley, 4 July 1987) – 9:33

7-inch single
 "Tell Me Why" – 4:58
 "Invisible Touch" (live) – 5:18

Personnel
 Tony Banks – keyboards
 Phil Collins – vocals, drums, percussion 
 Mike Rutherford – 12-string guitar, electric guitar, bass guitar

Charts

Release history

References

1991 songs
1992 singles
Charity singles
Genesis (band) songs
Political songs
Protest songs
Songs critical of religion
Songs written by Mike Rutherford
Songs written by Tony Banks (musician)
Songs written by Phil Collins
Virgin Records singles